Kate Lyn Sheil (born June 13, 1985) is an American actress. She is primarily known for her roles in independent films like You're Next, V/H/S, The Color Wheel, The Sacrament, and the award-winning Netflix series House of Cards.

Early life
Sheil was born and raised in Jersey City, New Jersey. She studied at New York University's Tisch School of the Arts, graduating in 2006 with a B.F.A. in acting. She also studied acting at the Lee Strasberg Theatre and Film Institute.

Career
In 2016, after her film Kate Plays Christine premiered at the Sundance Film Festival, she was dubbed "the Meryl Streep of the micro-budget film community" by Rolling Stone.

In 2020, Sheil starred in She Dies Tomorrow directed by Amy Seimetz, which was initially set to premiere at South by Southwest in March 2020, however the festival was scrapped due to the COVID-19 pandemic. The film was released by Neon via video on demand on August 7, 2020.

Filmography

Film

Television

References

Further reading
Interviews:
 Zachary Wigon, John Gallagher, Jr. and Kate Lyn Sheil on Intimacy, the Internet and The Heart Machine
 Kate Lyn Sheil's Video Past and Neftlix Future
 SXSW 2014 Interview: John Gallagher Jr. & Kate Lyn Sheil on The Heart Machine
 Modern Romance and Skype Sex: An Interview with Kate Lyn Sheil

External links
 

1985 births
Living people
21st-century American actresses
Actresses from Jersey City, New Jersey
Tisch School of the Arts alumni
American film actresses
American television actresses